Eligio Valentino (19 July 1925 – 10 October 2012) was an Italian sprint canoer who competed in the early 1950s. He was eliminated in the heats of the K-2 1000 m event at the 1952 Summer Olympics in Helsinki.

References

External links
 

1925 births
2012 deaths
Canoeists at the 1952 Summer Olympics
Italian male canoeists
Olympic canoeists of Italy
20th-century Italian people